Owen Township is located in Winnebago County, Illinois. As of the 2010 census, its population was 3,803 and it contained 1,546 housing units.

Geography

Demographics

References

External links
City-data.com
Winnebago County Official Site

1849 establishments in Illinois
Populated places established in 1849
Rockford metropolitan area, Illinois
Townships in Illinois
Townships in Winnebago County, Illinois